Brigadier Simon Christopher Joseph Fraser, 15th Lord Lovat, 4th Baron Lovat,  (9 July 1911 – 16 March 1995) was a prominent British Commando during the Second World War and the 25th Chief of the Clan Fraser of Lovat. Known familiarly as Shimi Lovat, an anglicised version of his name in Scottish Gaelic; his clan referred to him as MacShimidh, his Gaelic patronym. During Operation Overlord, he led the Special Service Brigade at Sword Beach and to successfully capture Pegasus Bridge, famously accompanied by his piper, Bill Millin.

Winston Churchill described Lovat as 'the handsomest man to slit a throat', being a renowned and feared military leader. Indeed, Hitler supposedly placed a bounty of 100,000 marks on his head, dead or alive in 1944. While the 15th Lord de jure, he was the 17th Lord Lovat de facto, but for the attainder of his Jacobite ancestor, the 11th Lord Lovat, who was famously executed in 1747. He was also 4th Baron Lovat in the Peerage of the United Kingdom.

Early life
Born at his ancestral home of Beaufort Castle near Beauly, Inverness-shire, Fraser was the son of Simon Fraser, 14th Lord Lovat (commonly known as the 16th Lord), and Laura, daughter of Thomas Lister, 4th Baron Ribblesdale. After being educated at Ampleforth College (where he was a member of the Officer Training Corps) and Magdalen College, Oxford, where he joined the University's Cavalry Squadron, Fraser was commissioned as a second lieutenant in the Lovat Scouts (a Territorial Army unit) in 1930. He transferred to the regular army while still a second lieutenant, joining the Scots Guards in 1931. The following year, Fraser succeeded his father to become the 15th Lord Lovat (referred to as the 17th Lord Lovat) and 25th Chief of the Clan Fraser.  He was promoted lieutenant in August 1934. Lovat resigned his regular commission as a lieutenant in 1937, transferring to the Supplementary Reserve of Officers.

He married Rosamond Broughton (1917–2012), the daughter of Sir Henry John Delves Broughton, on 10 October 1938, with whom he had six children. Lord and Lady Lovat lived at Beaufort Castle.

World War II
 

In June 1939, just months before the Second World War, Lord Lovat also resigned his reserve commission. In July, however, as war approached, he was mobilized as a captain in the Lovat Scouts. In 1940 together with his Stirling cousins and friends, including Donald Cameron of Lochiel, Lovat planned to create a new unorthodox group of shock fighters (Commandos) who would combine sea, air and land attacks using surprise as a key component. It was essential to use volunteers only. Crucial to the plan was the personal blessing of Sir Winston Churchill which they duly obtained. Lovat was personally involved in the training of the Commando troops on the West coast of Scotland. He was eventually attached to and led No. 4 Commando. On 3 March 1941, Nos 3 and 4 Commando launched a raid on the German-occupied Lofoten Islands. In the successful raid, the commandos destroyed fish-oil factories, petrol dumps, and 11 ships. They also seized encryption equipment and codebooks. As well, the commandos captured 216 German troops; 315 Norwegians chose to accompany the commandos back to Britain.

As a temporary major, Lord Lovat commanded 100 men of No. 4 Commando and a 50-man detachment from the Canadian Carleton and York Regiment in a raid on the French coastal village of Hardelot in April. For this action he was awarded the Military Cross on 7 July 1942. Lord Lovat became an acting lieutenant-colonel in 1942 and was appointed the commanding officer of No. 4 Commando, leading them in a successful component of the abortive Dieppe Raid (Operation Jubilee) on 19 August. His commando attacked and destroyed a battery of six 150 mm guns. Lovat was awarded the Distinguished Service Order (DSO). 

The raid as a whole was a disastrous failure with over 4,000 casualties sustained, predominantly Canadian. Yet No. 4 Commando executed its assault, with most men returning safely to Britain.

According to Hilary Saunders, the official biographer of the Commandos the men "were to arouse such a passion of hate and fear in the hearts of their enemies that first Von Runstedt and then Hitler in 1942 ordered their slaughter when captured down to the last man.  Lovat had 100,000 Reich marks placed on his head, dead or alive. The infamous "Commando Order".

In planning Operation Overlord, in 1944 Lord Lovat was made a brigadier and appointed the Commander of the newly formed 1st Special Service Brigade. Lord Lovat's brigade was landed at Sword during the invasion of Normandy on 6 June 1944. Lord Lovat reputedly waded ashore in battle dress contrary to the legend in the film the Longest Day which had him wearing a white jumper under his battledress, with "Lovat" inscribed into the collar while armed with a .45-70 Winchester underlever rifle. (The latter claim is disputed; however, in some earlier pictures y/1942 he is seen with a bolt-action .30-06 Winchester Model 70 sporting rifle). However, in his memoirs, 'March Past', Lovat states that he was armed with a "short barreled U.S. Army carbine" (presumably an M1 carbine) on D-Day.

Lord Lovat instructed his personal piper, Bill Millin, to pipe the commandos and himself ashore, in defiance of specific orders not to allow such an action in battle. When Private Millin demurred, citing the regulations, he recalled later, Lord Lovat replied: "Ah, but that’s the  War Office. You and I are both Scottish, and that doesn’t apply".

Lovat's forces swiftly pressed on, Lovat himself advancing with parts of his brigade from Sword to Pegasus Bridge, which had been defiantly defended by men of the 2nd Bn the Ox & Bucks Light Infantry (6th Airborne Division) who had landed in the early hours by glider. Lord Lovat's commandos arrived at a little past 1 p.m. at Pegasus Bridge though the rendezvous time as per the plan was noon. It is a common misconception that they reached almost exactly on time, late by only two and a half minutes. Upon reaching the rendezvous, Lord Lovat apologised to Lieutenant-Colonel Geoffrey Pine-Coffin, of 7th Parachute Battalion. He went on to establish defensive positions around Ranville, east of the River Orne. The bridges were relieved later in the day by elements of the British 3rd Infantry Division.

During the Battle of Breville on 12 June, Lord Lovat was seriously wounded whilst observing an artillery bombardment by the 51st Highland Division. A stray shell fell short of its target and landed amongst the officers, killing Lieutenant-Colonel A. P. Johnson, commanding officer of the 12th Parachute Battalion, also seriously wounding Brigadier Hugh Kindersley of the 6th Airlanding Brigade.

He was awarded the Legion of Honour and the Croix de Guerre by a grateful French Fourth Republic.

Later life

Lord Lovat was a stalwart of the Inverness Highland aristocracy. In 1942 he was appointed a Deputy lieutenant of the county, and two years later a Justice of the Peace. Lord Lovat made a full recovery from the severe wounds he had received in France but was unable to return to the army (he transferred to the reserve in 1949). In early 1945 Churchill sent him to Moscow as his envoy in a Parliamentary delegation to pay his respect to Stalin and the Presidium. Churchill notes in the final volume of his biography of the Second World War that at the crucial meeting with Stalin and President Roosevelt at Yalta in 1945 when the boundaries of Europe were being discussed Stalin kept coming back again and again, in conversation, to military questions: Stalin said he had acquired a new interest in life, says Churchill, an interest in military affairs.  "He liked young military fighters like Lord Lovat". ref: WC: the Second World War, volume VI, p. 344 Yalta finale. Winston Churchill requested that he become Captain of the Honourable Corps of Gentlemen-at-Arms in the House of Lords; however, Lord Lovat declined the offer and in 1945 joined the Government as Parliamentary Under-Secretary of State for Foreign Affairs, "becoming responsible for the functions of the Ministry of Economic Warfare when these were taken over by the Foreign Office", resigning upon Winston Churchill's election defeat. In 1946 he was made a Commander of the Venerable Order of Saint John. His formal retirement from the army came on 16 June 1962, he retained the honorary rank of brigadier.

Lord Lovat's involvement in politics continued throughout his life, in the House of Lords where he spoke on Scottish Affairs and served in the Inverness County Council for the next forty-two years where he pressed for modernising improvements.  He also devoted much of his time to the family estates of 250,000 acres in the highlands and to Fraser Clan affairs. He bred a pedigree herd of shorthorn cattle and was an international judge of cattle travelling widely to Canada, America, Latin America and Australia in that regard. He lectured on agronomy and loved racing. He was chieftain of Lovat Shinty Club, the local shinty team which bears his family name.  Lord Lovat experienced a great deal of sadness in his final years; two of his sons predeceased him in accidents within days of each other. In 1994, a year before his death, the family's traditional residence, Beaufort Castle, was sold by his eldest son, Simon Fraser, to pay inheritance taxes.

Lord Lovat's second son, Kim, played the pipes at Lord Lovat's funeral.

Media
The Longest Day, a 1962 film based on the book of the same name, features "Lord Lovat", played by Peter Lawford.

There is some suggestion that the charlatan commando character "Trimmer" in Evelyn Waugh's Sword of Honour trilogy of novels is based on Lovat. Lovat was closely associated with Waugh's forced resignation from the Commandos, which is the subject of an exchange of correspondence between them which Waugh pasted into his war diaries. In an article in Standpoint magazine, Paul Johnson wrote:

Family
Simon Christopher Joseph Fraser, Master of Lovat and 15th Lord Lovat (9 July 1911  –16 March 1995), was the son and eldest child of Simon Joseph Fraser, 14th Baron Lovat (25 November 1871 –18 February 1933), and the Hon. Laura Lister (12 January 1892 –24 March 1965). His younger brother was Hon. Sir Hugh Charles Patrick Joseph Fraser (23 January 1918 –6 March 1984).

He married Rosamond Delves Broughton on 10 October 1938.  They had six children:
Simon Augustine Fraser, Master of Lovat (28 August 1939 –26 March 1994) married Virginia Grose in 1972. They had four children: the Hon. Violet Fraser (b. 1972), the Hon. Honor Fraser (b. 1973), Simon Christopher Joseph Fraser, 16th Lord Lovat (b. 1977), and the Hon. John Fraser (b. 1984). Died at the age of 54 of a heart-attack while hunting on the family estate at Beaufort Castle.
Hon. Fiona Mary Fraser (born 6 July 1941) married Robin Richard Allen in 1982 and have no issue.
Hon. Annabel Thérèse Fraser (born 15 October 1942). She married Hugh William Mackay, 14th Baron Reay on 14 September 1964 and divorced in 1978. They had 3 children including Æneas Simon Mackay, 15th Baron Reay.
Hon. Kimball Ian Maurice Fraser (4 January 1946 –30 May 2020). He married Joanna North on 18 Oct 1975 and had 3 sons.
 Hon Alastair Hugh Joseph Fraser (14 November 1947 –20 February 2011) married Drusilla Montgomerie on 1 May 1976 and had four children. Died of cancer at the age of 63.
 Hon. Andrew Matthew Roy Fraser (24 February 1952 –15 March 1994) married Lady Charlotte Greville, daughter of the 8th Earl of Warwick, in 1979 and had 2 daughters: Daisy Rosamond Fraser (b. 1985) and Laura Alfreda Fraser (b. 1987). Died after being attacked by buffalo in Tanzania.

The 15th Lord Lovat's first son and heir Simon Augustine Fraser, Master of Lovat, and his fourth son Andrew predeceased him in 1994 within days of each other. The 15th Lord Lovat then died a year later in 1995. The title then passed to his grandson Simon Christopher Fraser, who became the 16th Lord Lovat.

References

External links
British Army Officers 1939–1945
Lord Lovat biography at The Pegasus Archive
The London Gazette (pdf format) 
LOVAT, 17th Lord, Who Was Who, A & C Black, 1920–2008; online edn, Oxford University Press, Dec 2012.
Obituary
The Clan Currie Society's Tribute to Private Bill Millin
Generals of World War II

1911 births
1995 deaths
Scottish military personnel
Alumni of Magdalen College, Oxford
Barons in the Peerage of the United Kingdom
British Army Commandos officers
British Army brigadiers of World War II
Clan Fraser
Companions of the Distinguished Service Order
Deputy Lieutenants of Inverness-shire
Scottish justices of the peace
Recipients of the Legion of Honour
Lovat Scouts officers
Members of Inverness County Council
People educated at Ampleforth College
Recipients of the Croix de Guerre 1939–1945 (France)
Recipients of the Military Cross
People from Highland (council area)
Scots Guards officers
Shinty players
Tennant family
Fraser, Simon Fraser, 7th Lord
Lords Lovat
Ministers in the Churchill caretaker government, 1945